{{Infobox person
 | image            = 
 | imagesize        = 
 | caption          = 
 | birth_name       = 
 | birth_date       = 
 | birth_place      = Connecticut
 | death_date       = 
 | death_place      = 
 | nationality      = American
 | occupation       = 
 | notable works    = WorkaholicsThe Grinder Allen Gregory Parks and RecreationHollywood HandbookKevin Can F**K Himself
}}

Sean Clements (born August 4, 1981) is an American writer, comedian, television producer, and podcast host. He grew up in Connecticut and is best known, along with Hayes Davenport, as one half of The Boys, the duo who hosts the podcast Hollywood Handbook. 
 
He has written for Kevin Can F**k Himself,  Ash vs Evil Dead, Stone Cold Fox, Workaholics, The Grinder, Allen Gregory, Making History,  Murder Police, and United We Fall, and was an executive producer on Ghosted. He has appeared as an actor in Workaholics, Parks and Recreation, The Colbert Report, Love, Comedy Bang! Bang!, Alone Together, and Curb Your Enthusiasm.

In addition to Hollywood Handbook, Clements is known for the premium spin-off podcasts Hollywood Masterclass, Hollywood Handbook: Pro Version, and The Flagrant Ones. Clements also starred in the limited run podcast An Oral History of the 1993 Tappan Jr. High School Talent Show''.

Clements is a frequent performer of improv at UCB, currently performing weekly with Shitty Jobs at UCB Franklin in Los Angeles since 2009. He previously performed on New York Harold teams from 2006 to 2009: Tantrum, The Fucking Kennedys, Bangs, and Badman.

References

External links
Hollywood Handbook

1981 births
Living people
Male actors from Connecticut
American male comedians
American comics writers
American male television actors
American television producers
American television writers
American male television writers
Comedians from California
21st-century American comedians
21st-century American screenwriters
21st-century American male writers